Castletownroche GAA club is a Gaelic Athletic Association club located in the village of Castletownroche, County Cork, Ireland. The club was founded in 1888 and competes as Castletownroche in hurling and dons the name Abbey Rovers in football. The club plays in the Avondhu division of Cork GAA.

Honours

 Cork Intermediate Hurling Championship (1): 1964  Runners-Up (3): 1961, 1963, 1970
 Cork Junior Hurling Championship (2): 1960, 1982  Runners-Up (1): 1979
 Cork Junior B Hurling Championship (2): 1998, 2019
 North Cork Junior A Hurling Championship (8): 1928, 1954, 1956, 1957, 1960, 1978, 1979, 1982  Runners-Up (8): 1950, 1952, 1953, 1955, 1959, 1980, 1991, 2007
 Cork Junior C Football Championship (1): 2018, Runners-up (1): 2016
 North Cork Junior B1 football Championship Winners 2018
 North Cork Junior Football League Winners 2013, 2015

Notable players
 Richie Browne
 Jonathan O'Callaghan - Double all-Ireland winner with cork 2004-2005
 David O'Leary

References

External links
Castletownroche GAA site

Gaelic games clubs in County Cork
Hurling clubs in County Cork